Karen Halverson (born 1941) is an American photographer.

Education
She received a BA degree in philosophy from Stanford University in 1963.  In 1965 she received an MA degree in the History of Ideas from Brandeis University, followed by an MA in Anthropology from Columbia University in 1975.

Publications
Downstream: Encounters with the Colorado River. University of California Press, 2008. .

Collections
Brooklyn Museum
Getty Museum 
Los Angeles County Museum of Art
Milwaukee Art Museum
Museum of Fine Arts, Houston
Smithsonian American Art Museum

References

1941 births
Living people
Artists from Syracuse, New York
20th-century American women artists
21st-century American women artists
20th-century American photographers
21st-century American photographers
Stanford University alumni
Brandeis University alumni
Columbia Graduate School of Arts and Sciences alumni